The 2022 World Fencing Championships was held from 15 to 23 July 2022 in Cairo, Egypt.

Schedule
Twelve events were held.

All times are local (UTC+2).

Medal summary

Medal table

Men

Women

References

External links
Official website

 
2022
World Championships
2022 in Egyptian sport
Sports competitions in Cairo
World Championships, 2022
World Fencing Championships